The 2019–20 Second League was the 65th season of the Second League, the second tier of the Bulgarian football league system, and the 4th season under this name and current league structure. The season began in July 2019 and ended in May 2020, but without playing all the scheduled games. The two promotion/relegation playoffs (involving teams from the First League as well) were held in July 2020.

After the possibility of holding matches without spectators was initially envisioned, on 13 March 2020, the Bulgarian Football Union decided to suspend all fixtures until 13 April in accordance with the measures taken to combat the COVID-19 pandemic. On 3 April 2020, the state of national emergency was extended until 13 May 2020 and on 11 April the Minister of Youth and Sports Krasen Kralev confirmed that no mass participation sports events and full training sessions will be held until that date. On 15 May 2020, the Bulgarian Football Union announced that the league will not be completed, with the standings after 22 rounds to be considered final. Reportedly, 10 of the lower-ranked clubs expressed a preference for this scenario due to the financial and personnel difficulties experienced by them as a result of the crisis, though Septemvri Sofia and Lokomotiv Sofia were opposed. CSKA 1948 gained promotion to the First League while Septemvri Sofia and Montana faced the teams who finished in the 13th (Tsarsko Selo) and the 12th (Dunav Ruse) places respectively in the highest league in promotion/relegation playoffs, with the former losing the playoff and the latter promoted.

The season was marred by controversies, as several teams were disqualified from the Second League and admitted to lower divisions. Vereya was disqualified before the season started and relegated to the fourth division. During the season, Pomorie declined to further participate, resulting in demotion to the Third League for next season, due to financial problems. Similarly to Pomorie, Botev Galabovo and Chernomorets Balchik decided to withdraw from the league (during the period when the games were halted) due to financial issues.

In July 2020, after the season, three Lokomotiv GO players, twelve Minyor Pernik playing personnel, two Neftochimic footballers, four members of the Hebar squad and four Septemvri footballers as well as a trainer were reported to have tested positive for COVID-19.

Teams
The following teams have changed division since the 2018–19 season.

To Second League 
Promoted from Third League
 Spartak Varna
 Neftochimic Burgas
 Spartak Pleven
 Hebar Pazardzhik

Relegated from First League
 Septemvri Sofia

From Second League 
Relegated to Third League
 Dobrudzha
 Nesebar

Promoted to First League
 Tsarsko Selo Sofia
 Arda Kardzhali
Note: FC Vereya, who were disqualified from the First League for match fixing, failed to obtain a professional license from the Bulgarian Football Union with the team instead entering the Southeast group of the Third Football League. As a result the Second League will consist of only 17 teams with no replacement team for Vereya's vacated spot.

Stadia and locations

Personnel and sponsorship
Note: Flags indicate national team as has been defined under FIFA eligibility rules. Players and managers may hold more than one non-FIFA nationality.

Note: Individual clubs may wear jerseys with advertising. However, only one sponsorship is permitted per jersey for official tournaments organised by UEFA in addition to that of the kit manufacturer (exceptions are made for non-profit organisations).
Clubs in the domestic league can have more than one sponsorship per jersey which can feature on the front of the shirt, incorporated with the main sponsor or in place of it; or on the back, either below the squad number or on the collar area. Shorts also have space available for advertisement.

Managerial changes

League table

Results

Positions by round

Results by round

Transfers
 List of Bulgarian football transfers summer 2019

References 

2019-20
2
Bul
Bulgaria